Ferocactus latispinus is a species of barrel cactus native to Mexico. Originally described as Cactus latispinus in 1824 by English naturalist Adrian Hardy Haworth, it gained its current name in 1922 with the erection of the genus Ferocactus by American botanists  Britton and Rose. The species name is derived from the Latin latus "broad", and spinus "spine".  Ferocactus recurvus is a former name for the species.

Distribution

The species is endemic to Mexico; the more widely distributed subspecies latispinus ranges from southeastern Durango, through Zacatecas, Aguascalientes, east to the western parts of San Luis Potosí, Hidalgo and Puebla, as well as to eastern Jalisco, Guanajuato, Querétaro and Mexico State. Subspecies spiralis is restricted to the southern parts of Oaxaca and Puebla. This species is typically found under nurse plants like tree canopies and shrubs. These nurse plants protect these smaller plant species below them from harsh weather conditions; being able to provide shade for the cacti in arid and sunny environments.

Description
Ferocactus latispinus grows as a single globular light green cactus reaching the dimensions of 30 cm (12 in) in height and 40 cm (16 in) across, with 21 acute ribs. Its spines range from reddish to white in colour and are flattened and reach 4 or 5 cm long. Flowering is in late autumn or early winter. The funnel-shaped flowers are purplish or yellowish and reach 4 cm long, and are followed by oval-shaped scaled fruit which reach 2.5 cm (1 in) long.

Subspecies
Two subspecies are recognised, differing in their number of radial spines. 
Ferocactus latispinus subsp. latispinus — 9–15 radial spines, Devil's Tongue Barrel or Crow's Claw Cactus. 
Ferocactus latispinus subsp. spiralis — 5–7 radial spines.

Cultivation
Ferocactus latispinus is fairly commonly cultivated as an ornamental plant. It blooms at an early age which is a desirable horticultural feature. It is hardy to −4 °C, with an average minimum temperature of 10 °C.

The slime mold, Didymium wildpretii feeds on the decaying remains of F. latispinus in Mexico.

References

latispinus
Cacti of Mexico
Endemic flora of Mexico
Flora of Central Mexico
Flora of Guanajuato
Flora of Hidalgo (state)
Flora of Puebla
Flora of Jalisco
Flora of Querétaro
Flora of Oaxaca
Flora of the State of Mexico
North American desert flora